The Hughes County Courthouse, located on Capitol Avenue in Pierre, is the center of government of Hughes County, South Dakota. The courthouse was built from 1934 to 1935, replacing a building built in 1883. Architects Hugill & Blatherwick designed the building in the Moderne style with Art Deco details, a common design choice in courthouses of the period. While their design was generally minimalist, it includes some Art Deco decorations, such as spandrels with patterned brickwork that divide the vertically arranged windows.

The courthouse was added to the National Register of Historic Places on February 10, 1993.

References

Courthouses on the National Register of Historic Places in South Dakota
Streamline Moderne architecture in the United States
Art Deco architecture in South Dakota
Government buildings completed in 1935
Buildings and structures in Hughes County, South Dakota
County courthouses in South Dakota
National Register of Historic Places in Pierre, South Dakota